The following is a list of notable Sri Lankan actors.

A
 Srilal Abeykoon
 Damitha Abeyratne
 Amila Abeysekara
 Tissa Abeysekara
 Dilani Abeywardana
 Joe Abeywickrama
 Kamal Addararachchi
 Anarkali Akarsha
 Daya Alwis
 Sriyani Amarasena
 Sumana Amarasinghe
 Shyama Ananda
 Madhavee Wathsala Anthony
 Jackson Anthony
 Dulani Anuradha
 Jayasekara Aponso
 Madhumadhawa Aravinda
 Samadhi Arunachaya
 Manike Attanayake

B
 K. S. Balachandran
 M. V. Balan
 Ramani Bartholomeusz
 Yolande Bavan
 Jagath Benaragama
 Sanoja Bibile
 Mabel Blythe
 Wickrama Bogoda
 Anula Bulathsinhala
 Lucien Bulathsinhala
 Nilmini Buwaneka

C
 Jagath Chamila
 Poongkothai Chandrahasan
 Susantha Chandramali
 Sarath Chandrasiri
 Maureen Charuni
 Pubudu Chathuranga
 Vasanthi Chathurani
 Tennyson Cooray

D
 Anusha Damayanthi
 Wimal Kumara de Costa
 Ruby de Mel
 Leena de Silva
 Somasiri Dehipitiya
 Lionel Deraniyagala
 Kamal Deshapriya
 Rukmani Devi
 David Dharmakeerthi
 Darshan Dharmaraj
 Annesley Dias
 Ashan Dias
 Dharmapriya Dias
 Gayathri Dias
 Lucky Dias
 Michelle Dilhara
 Sonia Disa
 Saranga Disasekara
 Thumindu Dodantenna
 Wasantha Dukgannarala

E
 Dilhani Ekanayake
 Alfred Edirimanne
 Lilian Edirisinghe
 Mercy Edirisinghe
 Sathischandra Edirisinghe

F
 Jacqueline Fernandez
 Alexander Fernando
 Baptist Fernando
 Bertram Fernando
 Gihan Fernando
 Hugo Fernando
 Kaushalya Fernando
 Nilukshi Fernando
 Nita Fernando 
 Robin Fernando
 Shyam Fernando
 Damayanthi Fonseka
 Gamini Fonseka
 Malini Fonseka
 Samanalee Fonseka

G
 D.B. Gangodathenna
 Martin Gunadasa
 Berty Gunathilake
 Sanath Gunathilake
 Dayananda Gunawardena
 Trilicia Gunawardena
 Nadeeka Gunasekara
 Wilson Gunaratne

H 
 Denawaka Hamine
 Nimmi Harasgama
 Gamini Haththotuwegama
 Punya Heendeniya
 Gamini Hettiarachchi
 Sunil Hettiarachchi
 Maureen Hingert
 Rajitha Hiran

I
 Semini Iddamalgoda
 T. B. Ilangaratne

J
 Dhamma Jagoda
 Anoma Janadari
 Asela Jayakody
 Bimal Jayakody
 Geetha Kanthi Jayakody
 Rathna Lalani Jayakody
 Veena Jayakody
 Florida Jayalath
 B. A. W. Jayamanne
 Eddie Jayamanne
 Prem Jayanth
 Thushari Jayasekera
 Henry Jayasena
 W. Jayasiri
 Mervyn Jayathunga
 Dommie Jayawardena
 Thesara Jayawardane
 Sabby Jey
 Suresh Joachim
 H.R. Jothipala
 Anton Jude
 Eddie Junior

K
 Amarasiri Kalansuriya
 Chandra Kaluarachchi
 Arjuna Kamalanath
 Gemini Kantha
 Sarala Kariyawasam
 Wilson Karunaratne
 Anula Karunathilaka
 Giriraj Kaushalya
 Rathnawali Kekunawela
 Alston Koch
 Rex Kodippili
 Chandrasiri Kodithuwakku
 Sarath Kothalawala
 Susila Kottage
 Lal Kularatne
 Jeewan Kumaranatunga
 Vijaya Kumaranatunga
 Geetha Kumarasinghe
 Wasantha Kumaravila
 Sandhya Kumari
 Seetha Kumari
 Janaka Kumbukage
 Susila Kuragama
 Jeevarani Kurukulasuriya
 Menik Kurukulasuriya

L
 Thusitha Laknath
 Ronnie Leitch
 Shanthi Lekha
 Hemasiri Liyanage
 Saumya Liyanage
 Isuru Lokuhettiarachchi

M
 Srinath Maddumage
 Swarna Mallawarachchi
 Vijitha Mallika
 Jayalath Manoratne
 Suraj Mapa
 Duleeka Marapana
 Sujani Menaka
 Cletus Mendis
 Kanchana Mendis
 Lakshman Mendis
 Sriyantha Mendis
 Devika Mihirani
 Albert Moses
 Bandu Munasinghe

N
 Vijaya Nandasiri
 Chandika Nanayakkara
 D. R. Nanayakkara
 Nethalie Nanayakkara
 Wally Nanayakkara
 Rebeka Nirmali
 Yureni Noshika

P
 Shesha Palihakkara
 Mahinda Pathirage
 Dasun Pathirana
 Asoka Peiris
 Chathurika Peiris
 Leticia Peiris
 Nehara Peiris
 Anthony C. Perera
 B. S. Perera
 Channa Perera
 Christy Leonard Perera
 G. R. Perera
 H. A. Perera
 Mahendra Perera
 N. M. Perera
 Sabeetha Perera
 Udari Perera
 Roshan Pilapitiya
 Asoka Ponnamperuma
 Janak Premalal
 Rangana Premaratne
 Uddika Premarathna
 Dinakshie Priyasad
 Shanudrie Priyasad
 Sheshadri Priyasad

R
 Menaka Rajapakse
 Ranjan Ramanayake
 Douglas Ranasinghe
 Hemal Ranasinghe
 Tony Ranasinghe
 Chulakshi Ranathunga
 Roshan Ranawana
 Ravindra Randeniya
 Sahan Ranwala
 Sirimathi Rasadari
 Priyankara Rathnayake
 Somy Rathnayake
 Thilak Kumara Rathnayake
 Udara Rathnayake
 King Ratnam
 Rita Ratnayake
 Roshan Ravindra
 Kusum Renu
 Granville Rodrigo
 Jayalal Rohana
 Nethmi Roshel
 Ravindra Rupasena

S
 Damitha Saluwadana
 Bandu Samarasinghe
 Miyuri Samarasinghe
 Mark Samson
 Paboda Sandeepani
 Himali Sayurangi
 Linton Semage
 Jayani Senanayake
 Chandani Seneviratne
 Priyantha Seneviratne
 Roger Seneviratne
 Iranganie Serasinghe
 Niranjani Shanmugaraja
 Deepani Silva
 Freddie Silva
 Nihal Silva
 Palitha Silva
 Don Sirisena
 Suminda Sirisena
 Mihira Sirithilaka
 Dhananjaya Siriwardena
 Himali Siriwardena
 Vinu Udani Siriwardhana
 Sachini Ayendra Stanley
 Edna Sugathapala
 Raja Sumanapala
 Rathna Sumanapala
 Upeksha Swarnamali

T
 Nilmini Tennakoon
 Sampath Tennakoon
 Shalani Tharaka
 Muthu Tharanga
 Daya Thennakoon
 Umali Thilakarathne
 Kumara Thirimadura

U
 Nalin Pradeep Udawela
 Pooja Umashankar

V
 Pearl Vasudevi
 Teddy Vidyalankara
 Bandula Vithanage
 Buddhadasa Vithanarachchi

W
 Chitra Wakishta
 Manel Wanaguru
 Ramya Wanigasekara
 Wijeratne Warakagoda
 Rodney Warnakula
 Udari Warnakulasooriya
 Ananda Weerakoon
 Sangeetha Weeraratne
 Anoja Weerasinghe
 Suvineetha Weerasinghe
 Ananda Wickramage
 Cyril Wickramage
 Umayangana Wickramasinghe
 Piyadasa Wijekoon
 Tissa Wijesurendra
 Gemunu Wijesuriya
 Yashoda Wimaladharma
 Sanath Wimalasiri

Y
 Ravindra Yasas
 Thisuri Yuwanika

References

 
Actors
Sri Lanka